Smirnoff is a brand of vodka.

Smirnoff may also refer to:

Smirnoff (surname)
Novell "Smirnoff",  codename of Personal NetWare 1.0

See also

Smirnov (disambiguation)